Dachsen is a municipality in the district of Andelfingen in the canton of Zürich in Switzerland.

History
Dachsen is first mentioned in 876 as Tahsheim.

Geography

Of this area, 52.8% is used for agricultural purposes, while 13% is forested. Of the rest of the land, 25.3% is settled (buildings or roads) and the remainder (8.9%) is non-productive (rivers, glaciers or mountains).

The municipality is a linear village (built along a single street) on a terrace near the Rhine knee near Laufen-Uhwiesen. Currently it is part of the agglomeration of Schaffhausen, even though it is in the canton of Zürich.

Demographics
, 11.4% of the population was made up of foreign nationals. Over the last 10 years the population has grown at a rate of 34%. Most of the population speaks German (95.1%), with Italian being second most common (1.6%) and French being third (0.7%).

In the 2007 election the most popular party was the SVP which received 35.2% of the vote. The next three most popular parties were the SPS (18.8%), the Green Party (12.8%) and the FDP (11.1%).

The age distribution of the population is children and teenagers (0–19 years old) make up 26.5% of the population, while adults (20–64 years old) make up 60% and seniors (over 64 years old) make up 13.5%. In Dachsen about 83.9% of the population (between age 25–64) have completed either non-mandatory upper secondary education or additional higher education (either university or a Fachhochschule).

Dachsen has an unemployment rate of 1.4%. , there were 30 people employed in the primary economic sector and about 8 businesses involved in this sector. 190 people are employed in the secondary sector and there are 17 businesses in this sector. 128 people are employed in the tertiary sector, with 38 businesses in this sector.

Historical population 
The historical population is given in the following graph:

Transportation 
Dachsen railway station is a stop of the S-Bahn Zürich on the line S33.

References

External links 

  
 

Municipalities of the canton of Zürich